Zhang Jiemin (born 1956 in Nantong) is a Chinese former volleyball player who played the setter position. She was part of the Chinese team that won gold at the 1981 FIVB Women's World Cup. She also won a silver medal at the 1978 Asian Games.

References

1956 births
Volleyball players from Jiangsu
Sportspeople from Nantong
Living people
Chinese women's volleyball players
Asian Games medalists in volleyball
Volleyball players at the 1978 Asian Games
Medalists at the 1978 Asian Games
Asian Games silver medalists for China